Choma may refer to:

Places
 Choma, Zambia, town and capital of Southern Province
 Choma District, district of Zambia
 Choma (Lycia), settlement of ancient Lycia
 Choma (fortress), Byzantine fortress in central Anatolia

People
John Choma (professor) (died 2014), American professor of electrical engineering
John Choma (American football) (born 1955), American football player
Ivan Choma (1923–2006), Ukrainian Greek-Catholic bishop in Italy
Russ Choma, American investigative journalist

Other uses
 Choma (Burn),  1971 album by American saxophonist Harold Land